West Tyson County Park is a county park in the U.S. state of Missouri consisting of  located in St. Louis County east of the town of Eureka. The park is located north of Interstate 44, west of Tyson Research Center, east of Route 66 State Park, and south and east of the Meramec River.

West Tyson County Park was originally part of the Tyson Valley Powder Plant during World War II. After the war  were acquired by St. Louis County in 1955. In 1979 an additional  were acquired. The Chubb Trail was developed in 1985. The William Epstein Memorial Prairie creation project was begun in 1988.

References

Protected areas established in 1955
Protected areas of St. Louis County, Missouri
1955 establishments in Missouri
Tourist attractions in St. Louis